Leionema viridiflorum  commonly known as green phebalium, is a species of flowering plant in the family Rutaceae. It is a small shrub with pale yellow-greenish flowers in clusters at the end of branches from winter to early spring. It has a restricted distribution in northern New South Wales.

Description
The calyx are fleshy and hemispherical shaped. Flowering occurs from winter to early spring.

Taxonomy and naming
This species was first formally described by Paul Wilson in 1970 and gave it the name Phebalium viridiflorum and the description was published in the journal Nuytsia. In 1998 Paul Wilson changed the name to Leionema viridiflorum and published the name change in the journal Nuytsia. The specific epithet (viridiflorum) means "green flowers".

Distribution and habitat
Leionema viridiflorum grows usually in heath on trachyte outcrops in the  Warrumbungle National Park and  Mount Kaputar National Park  in New South Wales.

References

External links

viridiflorum
Sapindales of Australia
Flora of New South Wales
Taxa named by Paul G. Wilson